French Quarter Moon is the second album by New Orleans-based band Evangeline for Margaritaville Records, an MCA Records subsidiary owned by Jimmy Buffett. The lineup for this album is Sharon Leger, Rhonda Bolin Lohmeyer, Beth McKee and Kathleen Steiffel.

Track listing

Musicians
Sharon Leger: Vocals, bass, washboard
Rhonda Bolin Lohmeyer: Vocals, electric guitar, acoustic guitar
Beth McKee: Vocals, keyboards, accordion
Kathleen Steiffel: Vocals, acoustic guitar
Eddie Bayers: Drums
Billy Panda: Electric guitar, acoustic guitar, National guitar, mandolin
Justin Niebank: Keyboards, percussion
Michael Utley: Organ, keyboards
Stuart Duncan: Violin

Production
Producer: Justin Niebank, Michael Utley
Production Coordination: Ragena Warden, Shellie Erwin
Photography: Beverly Parker
Art Direction: Virginia Team
Design: Jerry Joyner
Creative Director: Jim Kemp (MCA Records/Nashville), Shellie Erwin (Margaritaville Records)

All track information and credits were taken from the CD liner notes.

References

1993 albums
MCA Records albums